In histopathology, a small-blue-round-cell tumour (abbreviated SBRCT), also known as a small-round-blue-cell tumor (SRBCT) or a small-round-cell tumour (SRCT), is any one of a group of malignant neoplasms that have a characteristic appearance under the microscope, i.e. consisting of small round cells that stain blue on routine H&E stained sections.

These tumors are seen more often in children than in adults. They typically represent undifferentiated cells. The predominance of blue staining is because the cells consist predominantly of nucleus, thus they have scant cytoplasm.


Examples
Tumors that belong to this group are:
 Desmoplastic small-round-cell tumour
 Ewing sarcoma/PNET
 Neuroblastoma
 Medulloblastoma
 Rhabdomyosarcoma
 Synovial sarcoma
 Carcinoid tumor
 Mesothelioma
 Small cell lung cancer
 Wilms' tumour
 Retinoblastoma
 Small-cell lymphoma
 Hepatoblastoma- only the anaplastic form has round blue cells, the more common fetal and embryonal types do not 
 Merkel cell carcinoma
 Mesenchymal chondrosarcoma

Conditions mimicking SBRCT

Endometrial stromal condensation may mimic a small-blue-round-cell tumour.

References